María José Beaumont Aristu (born 1956) is a Navarrese politician, Minister of the Presidency, Civil Service, Interior and Justice of Navarre from July 2015 to August 2019.

References

1956 births
Government ministers of Navarre
EH Bildu politicians
Living people
Politicians from Navarre